is the ninth and final studio album by the Japanese girl band Princess Princess, released on December 13, 1995, by Sony Records. It includes the single "Fly Baby Fly". Prior to the release of the album, the band notified their label of their retirement in April 1995, citing friction between members over their musical direction. They announced their disbandment in August, and performed their final tour in 1996 before parting ways.

The album peaked at No. 10 on Oricon's albums chart.

Track listing 
All music is composed by Kaori Okui, except where indicated; all music is arranged by Princess Princess.

Charts

References

External links
 
 
 

Princess Princess (band) albums
1995 albums
Sony Music Entertainment Japan albums
Japanese-language albums